Zygos (Greek): Ζυγός; is a village, part of the municipality of Kavala in the Kavala regional unit, Greece. Population 2,057 (2011).

Name
The name of the village is Zygos, the Greek word for balancing scales.

Location
The village is located approximately 13 km north of Kavala. Zygos after the extensive reformation of administrative structure of Greece under the plan Kallikratis belongs to Municipality of Kavala. Located at the foot-hill of a dense pine forest, at the eastern edge of the Pangaio valley.

Sports
The village is famous for its football team, named Aris Zygou. Aris Zygou founded in 1933 and ceased to exist because of the World War II. The team refounded in 1946 and its 4th in the raw of the oldest teams in Kavala. Aris Zygou is among the most successful teams based in villages. Aris Zygou has played in the fourth national league of Greece for two periods 1990–91 and 1991–92. During these years manage to win Kavala Cup in 2006.

See also
List of settlements in the Kavala regional unit
Zygos Movement

References

2. ^ Kallikratis Program, Reformation of administrative structure of Greece(in Greek) https://web.archive.org/web/20110723235435/http://kallikratis.ypes.gr/

Populated places in Kavala (regional unit)